The 2010–11 Lega Pro Seconda Divisione season was the thirty-third football league season of Italian Lega Pro Seconda Divisione since its establishment in 1978, and the third since the renaming from Serie C to Lega Pro.

It was divided into two phases: the regular season, and the playoff phase.

The league is usually composed of 54 teams divided into three divisions of 18 teams each. This year, only 49 teams met the financial criteria of the league. They will be divided geographically into three divisions of 17, 16 and 16 teams. Teams will play only other teams in their own division, once at home and once away. The 17-team division teams will play 32 matches each, while the 16-team division teams will play 30 matches each.

Teams finishing first in the regular season, plus one team winning the playoff round from each division will be promoted to Lega Pro Prima Divisione.

Usually, three teams from each division are relegated to Serie D; the team finishing last and two relegation playoff losers. In order for the league's team total to rise to the normal 54 teams for the 2011–12 season, fewer teams will be relegated this year.
 In the group A of 17 teams will be relegated the 17th and the 16th, if the 15th place is more of 5 points ahead of this; otherwise the relegation playout loser between 15th and 16th place.
 In the group B and C of 16 teams, will be relegated the 16th, if the 15th place is more of 5 points ahead of this; otherwise the relegation playout loser between 15th and 16th place, with only one team being relegated from each of those divisions.

In all, six teams will be promoted to Prima Divisione, and four teams will be relegated to Serie D.

Events

Start of season
Given a normal season where there are no team failures and special promotions, Lega Pro Seconda Divisione would feature 6 teams that had been relegated from Lega Pro Prima Divisione, 9 teams that had been promoted from Serie D, and 39 teams had played in Lega Pro Seconda Divisione the year before. Due to twenty-one bankruptcies and non-admissions in the Serie B (one vacancy), Lega Pro Prima Divisione (seven vacancies) and Lega Pro Seconda Divisione (thirteen vacancies) the 2010–11 season was to feature only 3 teams that played in 2009–10 Lega Pro Prima Divisione, 20 teams that played in 2009-10 Serie D, 1 team that played in Eccellenza and 25 teams that played in 2009–10 Lega Pro Seconda Divisione. The league admitted sixteen teams to fill vacancies created. These teams are:
 Pro Vercelli (formerly P.B. Vercelli): P.B. Vercelli finished 17th in Lega Pro Seconda Divisione A and was originally relegated for losing in the play out, while the ex Pro Vercelli finished 10th.
 Bellaria Igea which finished 16th in Lega Pro Seconda Divisione B, originally relegated for losing in the playoffs.
 Carrarese which finished 18th in Lega Pro Seconda Divisione B, originally relegated for finishing at last place.
 Virtus Entella which finished 2nd in Serie D 2009-10 Girone A
 Casale which finished 3rd in Serie D 2009-10 Girone A
 Renate which finished 5th in Serie D 2009-10 Girone B
 Carpi which finished 2nd in Serie D 2009-10 Girone D
 L'Aquila which finished 4th in Serie D 2009-10 Girone F
 Campobasso which finished 10th in Serie D 2009-10 Girone F
 Pomezia which finished 3rd in Serie D 2009-10 Girone G
 Latina which finished 9th in Serie D 2009-10 Girone G
 Matera which finished 9th in Serie D 2009-10 Girone H
 Trapani which finished 2nd in Serie D 2009-10 Girone I
 Vigor Lamezia which finished 4th in Serie D 2009-10 Girone I
 Avellino which finished 5th in Serie D 2009-10 Girone I
 Sanremese which finished 1st in Eccellenza Liguria 2009-10

Five vacancies remained because no other teams filled for the spots.

Teams

Girone A

Girone B

Girone C

League table

Girone A

Girone B

Girone C

Promotion Playoffs

Girone A
Semifinals
First legs scheduled May 22, 2011; return legs scheduled May 29, 2011

Final
First leg scheduled June 5, 2011; return leg scheduled June 12, 2011

FeralpiSalò promoted to Lega Pro Prima Divisione

Girone B
Semifinals
First legs scheduled May 22, 2011; return legs scheduled May 29, 2011

Qualified to the final the teams best placed in the league table

Final
First leg scheduled June 5, 2011; return leg scheduled June 12, 2011

Carrarese promoted to Lega Pro Prima Divisione

Girone C
Semifinals
First legs scheduled May 22, 2011; return legs scheduled May 29, 2011

Final
First leg scheduled June 5, 2011; return leg scheduled June 12, 2011

Trapani promoted to Lega Pro Prima Divisione

Relegation Playoffs
Girone A
First leg scheduled May 22, 2011; return leg scheduled May 29, 2011

Sacilese relegated to Serie D

Girone B
Playoff not played.

Villacidrese relegated directly to Serie D.

Girone C
Playoff not played.

Pomezia relegated to Serie D by the Corte di Giustizia Federale of FIGC.

References

Lega Pro Seconda Divisione seasons
Italy
4